The Mississippi Court of Appeals is the intermediate-level appellate court for the state of Mississippi.  A creation of the Mississippi Legislature, the court began operations in 1995 for the purpose of relieving a backlog of cases before the Supreme Court of Mississippi.

Jurisdiction
The Mississippi Court of Appeals hears and decides appeals from the various trial courts of the state.  The cases the court hears are assigned to it by the Supreme Court of Mississippi, and generally concern issues in which the law is already settled, but the facts are in dispute.  Thus, contrary to federal procedure, Mississippi does not protect the common law right to a trial by jury, since it permits appellate review of facts found by a jury.  The Supreme Court may review Court of Appeals decisions, but if the Supreme Court declines review, the decision of the Court of Appeals stands.

The court's ten judges are elected from five districts and serve eight-year terms. Non-partisan elections are staggered so that not all positions are up for election at one time. The districts coincided with Mississippi's congressional districts prior to Mississippi's losing one district in 2000. Some of the state's counties are divided between districts. However, the districts are not jurisdictional: appeals from all over the state go to the Supreme Court and may be deflected by it to the Court of Appeals.

Jim Herring, who served on the court from 1997 to 1999 under appointment of Governor Kirk Fordice, later became the state chairman of the Mississippi Republican Party.

Judges
As of March 2021, there are ten judges on the Mississippi Court of Appeals:
Donna M. Barnes – Chief Judge
Virginia C. Carlton – Presiding Judge
Jack L. Wilson – Presiding Judge
Jim M. Greenlee
Latrice A. Westbrooks
Deborah McDonald
Anthony N. Lawrence III
David Neil McCarty
Joel Smith
John H. Emfinger

References

External links
Homepage of the Mississippi Court of Appeals

Mississippi state courts
State appellate courts of the United States
1995 establishments in Mississippi
Courts and tribunals established in 1995